Kong Hee-yong (Hangul: 공희용; born 11 December 1996) is a South Korean badminton player. In 2013, she won the mixed team gold at the BWF World Junior Championships. In 2014, Kong who was educated at the Daesung girls' high school competed at the Asian Junior Championships and won the silver medals in the mixed team and doubles event. She also play for the Jeonbuk Bank at the national event, and at the 2017 Japan Open, she became the runner-up in the women's doubles event partnered with Kim Ha-na. Together with Kim So-yeong, she was awarded as the 2019 BWF Most Improved Player of the Year.

Achievements

Olympic Games 
Women's doubles

BWF World Championships 
Women's doubles

Asian Championships 
Women's doubles

Asian Junior Championships 
Mixed doubles

BWF World Tour (8 titles, 6 runners-up) 
The BWF World Tour, which was announced on 19 March 2017 and implemented in 2018, is a series of elite badminton tournaments sanctioned by the Badminton World Federation (BWF). The BWF World Tour is divided into levels of World Tour Finals, Super 1000, Super 750, Super 500, Super 300, and the BWF Tour Super 100.

Women's doubles

BWF Superseries (1 runner-up) 
The BWF Superseries, which was launched on 14 December 2006 and implemented in 2007, was a series of elite badminton tournaments, sanctioned by the Badminton World Federation (BWF). BWF Superseries levels were Superseries and Superseries Premier. A season of Superseries consisted of twelve tournaments around the world that had been introduced since 2011. Successful players were invited to the Superseries Finals, which were held at the end of each year.

Women's doubles

  BWF Superseries Finals tournament
  BWF Superseries Premier tournament
  BWF Superseries tournament

BWF Grand Prix (1 runner-up) 
The BWF Grand Prix had two levels, the Grand Prix and Grand Prix Gold. It was a series of badminton tournaments sanctioned by the Badminton World Federation (BWF) and played between 2007 and 2017.

Women's doubles

  BWF Grand Prix Gold tournament
  BWF Grand Prix tournament

BWF International Challenge/Series (2 runners-up) 
Mixed doubles

  BWF International Challenge tournament
  BWF International Series tournament

References

External links 
 

1996 births
Living people
Sportspeople from Daejeon
South Korean female badminton players
Badminton players at the 2020 Summer Olympics
Olympic badminton players of South Korea
Olympic bronze medalists for South Korea
Olympic medalists in badminton
Medalists at the 2020 Summer Olympics
Badminton players at the 2018 Asian Games
Asian Games competitors for South Korea
World No. 1 badminton players
21st-century South Korean women